Charles William Henry Chilcott Bremner (25 March 1879 – 4 November 1961) was a New Zealand lawn bowls player who won a gold medal in the men's fours at the 1938 British Empire Games. He also won four national lawn bowls titles.

Biography
Born in Dunedin on 25 March 1879, Bremner was the son of Mary Ann and George Goddard Bremner. He was educated in Dunedin, but spent much of his life in Invercargill, before moving to Auckland. He was a land agent and architect. On 26 December 1902, Bremner married Alice Genevieve McLachlan, and they had two children.

Bremner won four New Zealand national bowls championship titles, representing the West End Bowling Club from Auckland: the men's fours in 1924 and 1929; and the men's pairs in 1932 and 1940.

At the 1938 British Empire Games in Sydney, Bremner was the skip the men's four—with Ernie Jury, Alec Robertson and Bill Whittaker—that won the gold medal.

Bremner died in Auckland on 4 November 1961, having been predeceased by his wife in 1949. He was buried at Hillsborough Cemetery, Auckland.

References

1879 births
1961 deaths
Sportspeople from Dunedin
New Zealand male bowls players
Commonwealth Games gold medallists for New Zealand
Bowls players at the 1938 British Empire Games
Commonwealth Games medallists in lawn bowls
Burials at Hillsborough Cemetery, Auckland
Medallists at the 1938 British Empire Games